Scott Darrell Guptill (May 16, 1889 – 1949) was a Canadian politician. He served in the Legislative Assembly of New Brunswick as member of the Conservative party representing Charlotte County from 1912 to 1935.

References

20th-century Canadian politicians
Progressive Conservative Party of New Brunswick MLAs
1889 births
1949 deaths